Subodh Adhikary is an Indian politician from All India Trinamool Congress. In May 2021, he was elected as the member of the West Bengal Legislative Assembly from Bijpur. He is also the District General Secretary of All India Trinamool Congress from North 24 Parganas district.

Career
Adhikary hails from Halisahar, North 24 Parganas. He passed B.A. in 2014 from Mahatma Gandhi University, West Bengal. His father's name is Santosh Adhikary. He contested 2021 West Bengal Legislative Assembly election from Bijpur Vidhan Sabha and won the seat against Mukul Roy’s son Shubranshu Roy.

References

Living people
21st-century Indian politicians
Trinamool Congress politicians from West Bengal
Mahatma Gandhi University, Kerala alumni
People from North 24 Parganas district
West Bengal MLAs 2021–2026
1972 births